Vahram Sahakian (sometimes as Vahram Sahakyan, born 22 September 1968, Yerevan, Armenian SSR) is an Armenian dramatist, film director and actor.

Plays

Dramaturgy
Rye Key (2009)
Two friends, to Say Nothing of the Life (2006)
Why roars City (2003)
Mea Culpa (My Fault) (2002)
Hello, I'm Staying (2000)
Khatabalada (1996)
Once upon a time in Armenia (1991)
That Very Pepo (1990)
Vozniner in Air (1988), (featuring Vardan Petrosyan)

Screenplays
Yerevan - Los angeles - Yerevan (1992)

Selected bibliography
Eyes black, white tablecloth (2002) (Romance)
Brutes (2005) Essayes
Eternal gallows (2008) (Romance)

Filmography
The scoundrel Armenian (2020) director
Death Pirate (2007) director
Les Bavardes Tres libre-3 (2006) director
Film-Prison (2005) director
Vardan and Margarita (2004) director
Les Bavardes Tres libre 2 (2003) director
World cattle (2002) director
Les Bavardes Tres libre (2000) director
Le tous dernier tango a Paris -2 (1998) director, actor (featuring with Vardan Petrosyan)
Mer Verje - Our end (1998) director, actor
Policie (1995) director
Every way (1993) director, actor
Le tous dernier tango a Paris (1992) director, actor (featuring with Vardan Petrosyan)
Once upon a time in Yerevan (1991) director

External links
 

20th-century Armenian writers
Armenian male film actors
Living people
1964 births
Writers from Yerevan
21st-century Armenian male writers
21st-century Armenian writers